The Alfa Romeo 85A is an Italian bus produced by Alfa Romeo in small series in the beginning of the 1930s.

History 
The body of the bus is based on body of Macchi.

Production 
Around 30 were produced in Italy.

See also
 List of buses

References 
Archive from Italian public transport on Rome

References 

085A